Mark Manendo (born October 2, 1966) is a former Democratic member of the Nevada Senate, representing District 21.  Manendo was elected as half of a dual-member district in 2010 in Clark No. 7 but in 2011 redistricting split the dual member district and renumbered his constituency to District 21.

The areas Senator Manendo represented were portions of Clark County which included areas of Las Vegas, Sunrise Manor, Whitney, Lake Las Vegas, part of Lake Mead National Recreation Area, and the Clark County Wetlands Park. He formerly served in the Nevada Assembly, representing Clark County District 18 from 1994 to 2010.

On July 18, 2017, Sen. Manendo resigned after the competition of an investigation into allegations of sexual harassment found "Senator Manendo violated the Legislature's anti-harassment policy; had engaged in multiple and repeated instances of inappropriate, offensive, and unacceptable behavior towards female staffers and lobbyists; and had attempted to interfere with the subsequent investigation into his conduct."

Electoral history
Manendo was elected in 1994 and 1996 to the Nevada Assembly from the Clark County 18th District.

References

External links 
- Leglislative Biography official government website
- VoteSmart Profile on Mark Manendo(NV)
- Follow The Money Profile on Mark Manendo

Members of the Nevada Assembly
Nevada state senators
1966 births
Living people
21st-century American politicians